"(I Don't Know Why) But I Do" is an R&B song written by Paul Gayten and Bobby Charles (as Robert Guidry), and performed by Clarence "Frogman" Henry.

Original version
It was Henry's biggest U.S. hit, reaching No. 4 in early 1961. The B-side on the single release was "Just My Baby and Me".

On its initial release in December 1960, the U.S. release on the Argo record label was titled "I Don't Know Why". However, about ten weeks later, Argo announced that due to confusion arising from the song being mistaken for the 1931 song called "I Don't Know Why (I Just Do)", they changed the name of this song to "But I Do". The UK release on the Pye label and the Australian release on the Coronet label were both titled "But I Do". The UK version spent 19 weeks in the charts and peaked at No. 3 in the first week of May 1961.

The song was made popular again after its use in a 1993 UK television commercial for the Fiat Cinquecento, appearances in the 1994 film Forrest Gump, the 1999 film Mickey Blue Eyes, and a 2019 commercial for Expedia and its ability to provide dog-friendly hotel accommodations.

Chart history

Weekly charts

Year-end charts

Bobby Vinton cover

Bobby Vinton covered "But I Do" in 1972.  His version reached No. 82 on the U.S. Billboard Hot 100 and No. 71 on the Cash Box chart in early 1973.  It also reached #27 on the Adult Contemporary chart.

The song also charted in Canada on both the Pop chart (#72) and Adult Contemporary (#23) chart, where it made its best showing.

Chart history

Other versions
 Irish girl group the Nolans covered the song in 1974. It was their debut single, but did not chart.
 Dutch duo Lion had a local success with a cover of "But I Do" with "You've Got a "Woman" as the B-side in 1975. 
 Tom Jones covered the song on his 1981 LP Darlin' / The Country Side of Tom Jones.  It was also released as a single but did not chart.
 Charley Pride covered "But I Do" in 1996 on his album Classics with Pride.

References
 
"Billboard". Billboard Hot 100 airplay and sales charts. Retrieved June 11, 2006.

1961 singles
American songs
Ronnie Milsap songs
Clarence "Frogman" Henry songs
Bobby Vinton songs
The Walker Brothers songs
1974 debut singles
The Nolans songs
Songs written by Bobby Charles
Songs written by Paul Gayten
1961 songs
Argo Records singles